D'Iberville is a city in Harrison County, Mississippi, United States, immediately north of Biloxi, across the Back Bay. As of the 2010 United States Census, it had a population of 9,486. It is part of the Gulfport–Biloxi Metropolitan Statistical Area.

Etymology
It is named after Canadian explorer Pierre Le Moyne d'Iberville, who arrived at the area in 1699. Almost 300 years later, D'Iberville officially became a city in 1988.

History
D'Iberville was one of the Gulf Coast cities hit and extensively damaged by Hurricane Katrina on August 29, 2005. The following month, Mexican marines, the U.S. Navy, and Dutch navy sailors were sent to the city to clean up hurricane debris and distribute aid supplies.

As a result of an initiative by the Congress for the New Urbanism under the sponsorship of Governor Haley Barbour and the State of Mississippi, the City of D'Iberville received town design consulting services from some of the most prestigious urban designers in the country. Since then, the City of D'Iberville has been working with Jaime Correa and Associates on the implementation of its master plan, on a full-fledged New Urbanism SmartCode for its downtown area, and on the implementation of mixed-use neighborhoods and main street.

Geography

Education
The city of D'Iberville is served by the Harrison County School District.
 D'Iberville High School
 D'Iberville Middle School
 D'Iberville Elementary School

Demographics

2020 census

As of the 2020 United States census, there were 12,721 people, 4,979 households, and 3,137 families residing in the city.

2000 census
As of the census of 2000, there were 7,608 people, 2,827 households, and 1,976 families residing in the city. The population density was 1,604.1 people per square mile (619.7/km). There were 3,088 housing units at an average density of 651.1 per square mile (251.5/km). The racial makeup of the city was 78.21% White, 11.40% African American, 0.37% Native American, 7.03% Asian, 0.01% Pacific Islander, 0.85% from other races, and 2.13% from two or more races. Hispanic or Latino of any race were 2.64% of the population.

There were 2,827 households, out of which 34.1% had children under the age of 18 living with them, 49.6% were married couples living together, 15.2% had a female householder with no husband present, and 30.1% were non-families. 23.0% of all households were made up of individuals, and 5.6% had someone living alone who was 65 years of age or older. The average household size was 2.69 and the average family size was 3.17.

In the city, the population was spread out, with 27.0% under the age of 18, 9.6% from 18 to 24, 32.3% from 25 to 44, 22.5% from 45 to 64, and 8.6% who were 65 years of age or older. The median age was 34 years. For every 100 females, there were 99.5 males. For every 100 females age 18 and over, there were 96.9 males.

The median income for a household in the city was $34,700, and the median income for a family was $40,347. Males had a median income of $26,774 versus $22,259 for females. The per capita income for the city was $15,846. About 9.0% of families and 11.7% of the population were below the poverty line, including 16.9% of those under age 18 and 9.5% of those age 65 or over.

As of January 2018, the mayor of D'Iberville is Russell "Rusty" Quave. He has held this position since 1993 for over two decades.

Notable people
 Brandon Davis, mixed martial arts fighter
 Jason Knight, mixed martial arts fighter
 Christine Kozlowski, actress and Miss Mississippi 2008
 Kevin Norwood, former NFL wide receiver
 Chase Sherman, mixed martial arts fighter

References

External links

 
 City of D'Iberville official website
 D'Iberville Citizens' Master Plan

Cities in Mississippi
Gulfport–Biloxi metropolitan area
Cities in Harrison County, Mississippi
French-American culture in Mississippi
Populated places established in 1988
New Urbanism communities